Gerald Byrne (born 10 April 1957) is a Scottish former professional footballer who played as a midfielder. He played in the Football League with Cardiff City before moving into non-league football.

Career
Born in Glasgow, Byrne joined Cardiff City in 1975 but was forced to wait three years before making his professional debut in a 0–0 draw with Tottenham Hotspur. He struggled to establish himself in the first team in the following two seasons before being released, later joining Weymouth. He spent two years with Weymouth, making over 100 appearances, before spending a single season with Bath City.

References

1957 births
Footballers from Glasgow
Scottish footballers
Cardiff City F.C. players
Weymouth F.C. players
Bath City F.C. players
English Football League players
Association football midfielders
Living people